The Merope Nebula (also known as Tempel's Nebula and NGC 1435) is a diffuse reflection nebula in the Pleiades star cluster, surrounding the 4th magnitude star Merope. It was discovered on October 19, 1859 by the German astronomer Wilhelm Tempel. The discovery was made using a 10.5cm refractor.  John Herschel included it as 768 in his General Catalogue of Nebulae and Clusters of Stars but never observed it himself. 

The Merope Nebula has an apparent magnitude starting at 13 and quickly dimming by a factor of about 15, making most of the nebula dimmer than magnitude 16. It is illuminated entirely by the star Merope, which is embedded in the nebula. It contains a bright knot, IC 349, about half an arcminute wide near Merope, which was discovered by Edward Emerson Barnard in November 1890. It is naturally very bright but is almost hidden in the radiance of Merope. It appears blue in photographs because of the fine carbon dust spread throughout the cloud. Though it was once thought the Pleiades formed from this and surrounding nebulae, it is now known that the Pleiades nebulosity is caused by a chance encounter with the cloud.

Gallery

References

External links 
 
 
 Seds NGC 1435 page

1435
Pleiades Open Cluster
Reflection nebulae
Taurus (constellation)